Jewish Resistance Against the Nazis (2014) is a collection of essays edited by Patrick Henry and published by Catholic University of America Press. Discussing Jewish resistance in German-occupied Europe, the book argues that Jews resisted Nazi rule in a variety of ways. Contributors include Yehuda Bauer and Nechama Tec. It received positive reviews.

References

2014 non-fiction books
History books about the Holocaust
Jewish resistance during the Holocaust
Catholic University of America Press books